Giliard is a village near the city of Damavand, Iran. It is the site of an ancient Jewish cemetery. It is also called Jilard by the people living there.

Populated places in Tehran Province